Rachel Griffiths is an Australian actress and director who initially came to acclaim for her appearance in the 1994 Australian comedy film Muriel's Wedding, which earned her an AACTA Award for Best Supporting Actress. She would later gain critical recognition for her role in Hilary and Jackie (1998), which earned her an Academy Award nomination for Best Supporting Actress. Griffiths would later receive critical praise for her performances on the American television series Six Feet Under (2001–2005), for which she would earn a Golden Globe Award and two Screen Actors Guild Awards; and Brothers & Sisters, for which she earned two Golden Globe nominations and two Primetime Emmy Award nominations.

AACTA Awards

Academy Awards

Australian Film Institute Awards

British Independent Film Awards

Golden Globe Awards

Helpmann Awards

Irish Film and Television Awards

London Film Festival

Melbourne International Film Festival

Palm Springs International ShortFest

Primetime Emmy Awards

Satellite Awards

Screen Actors Guild Awards

Critics' awards

Chicago Film Critics Association

Film Critics Circle of Australia

Television Critics Association Awards

References

Lists of awards received by Australian actor